Vexillum bergae is a species of sea snail, a marine gastropod mollusk, in the family Costellariidae, the ribbed miters.

Distribution
This marine species occurs off the Philippines.

References

 Cossignani T. (2020). Vexillum bergae: una nuova specie dalle Filippine. Malacologia Mostra Mondiale. 106: 25-26

External links

bergae
Gastropods described in 2020